Piano Sonata No. 12 may refer to: 
Piano Sonata No. 12 (Beethoven)
Piano Sonata No. 12 (Mozart)